Yan Wei (born 4 October 1973) is a retired Chinese middle distance runner who specialized in the 1500 metres.

She finished tenth at the 1993 World Championships, won the 1993 Asian Championships and took the silver at the 1994 Asian Games.

Her personal best time was 3:58.74 minutes, achieved in October 1997 in Shanghai.

References

1973 births
Living people
Chinese female middle-distance runners
Asian Games medalists in athletics (track and field)
Athletes (track and field) at the 1994 Asian Games
Athletes (track and field) at the 1998 Asian Games
Asian Games silver medalists for China
Medalists at the 1994 Asian Games